Hollis Douglas Sims (born June 29, 1943) is an American former professional basketball player. He played in the NBA for the Cincinnati Royals in four games at the beginning of the 1968–69 season. He recorded four points and four rebounds.

References

1943 births
Living people
Amateur Athletic Union men's basketball players
American men's basketball players
Basketball players from Alabama
Basketball players from Ohio
Cincinnati Royals players
Forwards (basketball)
Kent State Golden Flashes men's basketball coaches
Kent State Golden Flashes men's basketball players
People from Elba, Alabama
People from Summit County, Ohio
Undrafted National Basketball Association players